The 2016–17 BYU Cougars women's basketball team represented Brigham Young University during the 2016–17 NCAA Division I women's basketball season. It was head coach Jeff Judkins's sixteenth season at BYU. The Cougars, members of the West Coast Conference, play their home games at the Marriott Center. They finished the season 20–12, 13–5 in WCC play to finish in a tie for second place. They advanced to the semifinals of the WCC women's tournament where they lost to Saint Mary's. They received an automatic bid to the WNIT where they lost to Washington State in the first round.

Before the season

Departures

2016–17 media

BYU Radio Sports Network Affiliates

22 Cougar games that don't conflict with men's basketball or football games will be featured live on BYU Radio, found nationwide on Dish Network 980, on Sirius XM 143, and online at www.byuradio.org. Home games will be a BYUtv simulcast while road games will be voiced by Robbie Bullough or Mitchell Marshall. Select road games will air on TheW.tv.

Roster

Schedule

|-
!colspan=8 style="background:#002654; color:white;"| Exhibition

|-
!colspan=8 style="background:#002654; color:white;"| Non-conference regular season

|-
!colspan=8 style="background:#002654; color:white;"| WCC regular season

|-
!colspan=8 style="background:#002654;"| WCC Tournament

|-
!colspan=8 style="background:#002654;"|  Women's National Invitation Tournament

Game Summaries

Exhibition: Westminster
Broadcasters: Spencer Linton, Kristen Kozlowski, & Jason Shepherd
Starting Lineups:
Westminster: Aubrie Vale, Sydnee Taylor, Riley Reidhead, Denise Gonzalez, Whitni Syrett
BYU: Cassie Broadhead, Kristine Nielson, Makenzi Pulsipher, Kalani Purcell, Jasmine Moody

Exhibition: Colorado Mesa
Broadcasters: Jarom Jordan, Kristen Kozlowski, & Jason Shepherd
Starting Lineups:
Colorado Mesa: Nicole Archambeau, Bryanna Adams, Erin Reichle, Sydney Small, Kassidi Day
BYU: Cassie Broadhead, Kristine Nielson, Makenzi Pulsipher, Kalani Purcell, Jasmine Moody

Utah Valley
Broadcasters: None (Wolverine Green stream)/ Mitchell Marshall (BYUR)
Series History: BYU leads series 6–0
Starting Lineups:
BYU: Makenzi Pulsipher, Cassie Broadhead, Kalani Purcell, Kristine Nielson, Jasmine Moody
Utah Valley: Britta Hall, Mariah Seals, Taylor Gordon, Sam Lubcke, Jordan Holland

Georgia
Broadcasters: Matt Stewart & Christi Thomas (SEC+)/ Mitchell Marshall (BYUR)
Series History: BYU leads series 1–0
Starting Lineups:
BYU: Makenzi Pulsipher, Cassie Broadhead, Kalani Purcell, Kristine Nielson, Jasmine Moody
Georgia: Halle Washington, Mackenzie Engram, Shanea Armbrister, Pachis Roberts, Haley Clark

Oklahoma
Broadcasters: Mitchell Marshall & Keilani Unga
Series History: Oklahoma leads series 4–1
Starting Lineups:
Oklahoma: Maddie Manning, Vionise Pierre-Louis, Peyton Little, Gabbi Ortiz, Gioya Carter
BYU: Makenzi Pulsipher, Cassie Broadhead, Kalani Purcell, Kristine Nielson, Jasmine Moody

UNM Thanksgiving Tournament: Saint Joseph's
Series History: Series tied 1–1
Starting Lineups:
Saint Joseph's: Mackenzie Rule, Alyssa Monaghan, Sarah Veilleux, Chelsea Woods, Adashia Franklyn
BYU: Makenzi Pulsipher, Cassie Broadhead, Kalani Purcell, Kristine Nielson, Jasmine Moody

UNM Thanksgiving Tournament: Tulsa
Series History: BYU leads series 7–0
Starting Lineups:
Tulsa: Tatyana Perez, Erika Wakefield, Alexis Gaulden, Crystal Polk, Liesl Spoerl
BYU: Makenzi Pulsipher, Cassie Broadhead, Kalani Purcell, Kristine Nielson, Jasmine Moody

Maui Wahine Classic: UNLV
Series History: UNLV leads series 29–12
Starting Lineups:
UNLV: Brooke Johnson, Paris Strawther, Nikki Wheatley, Dylan Gonzales, Katie Powell
BYU: Makenzi Pulsipher, Cassie Broadhead, Kalani Purcell, Kristine Nielson, Jasmine Moody

Maui Wahine Classic: Oregon State
Series History:BYU leads series 6–4
Starting Lineups:
Oregon State: Sydney Wiese, Gabriella Hanson, Marie Gülich, Katie McWilliams, Kolbie Orum
BYU: Makenzi Pulsipher, Cassie Broadhead, Kalani Purcell, Kristine Nielson, Jasmine Moody

Weber State
Broadcasters: Spencer Linton, Kristen Kozlowski & Jason Shepherd
Series History: BYU leads series 43–9
Starting Lineups:
Weber State: Emily Drake, Kailie Quinn, Deeshyra Thomas, Yarden Danan, Tyschal Blake
BYU: Makenzi Pulsipher, Cassie Broadhead, Kalani Purcell, Kristine Nielson, Shalae Salmon

Utah
Broadcasters: Krista Blunk & Tammy Blackburn (P12)/ Robbie Bullough (BYUR)
Series History: BYU leads series 62–42
Starting Lineups:
BYU: Makenzi Pulsipher, Cassie Broadhead, Kalani Purcell, Kristine Nielson, Shalae Salmon
Utah: Emily Drake, Kailie Quinn, Deeshyra Thomas, Yarden Danan, Tyschal Blake

Utah State
Broadcasters: Craig Hislop (MW Net)/ Robbie Bullough (BYUR) 
Series History: BYU leads series 34–3
Starting Lineups:
BYU: Makenzi Pulsipher, Cassie Broadhead, Kalani Purcell, Kristine Nielson, Shalae Salmon
Utah State: Hailey Bassett, Deja Mason, Eliza West, Jessie Geer, Rachel Brewster

Washington
Broadcasters: Dave McCann, Kristen Kozlowski, & Jason Shepherd
Series History: Series even 5–5
Starting Lineups:
Washington: Kesley Plum, Natalie Romeo, Aarion McDonald, Katie Collier, Chantel Osahor
BYU: Makenzi Pulsipher, Cassie Broadhead, Kalani Purcell, Kristine Nielson, Shalae Salmon

Santa Clara
Broadcasters: Doug Greenwald
Series History: BYU leads series 13–1
Starting Lineups:
BYU: Makenzi Pulsipher, Cassie Broadhead, Kalani Purcell, Kristine Nielson, Shalae Salmon
Santa Clara: Morgan McGwire, Emily Wolph, Marie Bertholdt, Taylor Berry, Lori Parkinson

Loyola Marymount
Broadcasters: Spencer Linton, Kristen Kozlowski, & Jason Shepherd
Series History: BYU lead series 12–1
Starting Lineups:
Loyola Marymount: Cheyanne Walalce, Andee Velasco, Leslie Lopez-Wood, Brittney Reed, Jackie Johnson
BYU: Makenzi Pulsipher, Cassie Broadhead, Kalani Purcell, Kristine Nielson, Shalae Salmon

Saint Mary's
Broadcasters: Spencer Linton, Kristen Kozlowski, & Jason Shepherd
Series History: Series even 6–6
Starting Lineups:
Saint Mary's: Devyn Galland, Carly Turner, Sydney Raggio, Megan McKay, Jasmine Forcadilla
BYU: Makenzi Pulsipher, Cassie Broadhead, Kalani Purcell, Kristine Nielson, Shalae Salmon

Pacific
Broadcasters: Don Gubbins (TheW.tv)/ Robbie Bullough (BYUR)
Series History: BYU lead series 11–2
Starting Lineups:
BYU: Makenzi Pulsipher, Cassie Broadhead, Kalani Purcell, Kristine Nielson, Shalae Salmon
Pacific: Emily Simons, Eli Lopez Sagrera, GeAnna Luaulu-Summers, Unique Coleman, Desire Finnie

San Francisco
Broadcasters: Kevin Danna
Series History: BYU leads series 15–3
Starting Lineups:
BYU: Makenzi Pulsipher, Cassie Broadhead, Kalani Purcell, Kristine Nielson, Shalae Salmon
San Francisco: Rachel Howard, Michaela Rakova, Anna Seilund, Alicia Roufosse, Kalyn Simon

{{basketballbox
 | bg = #e3e3e3
 | date = Jan 12
 | time = 7:00 p.m. PST
 | report = Recap
 | team1 = BYU Cougars 
 | score1 = 63
 | team2 = San Francisco Dons
 | score2 = 70
 | Q1 = 17–15
 | Q2 = 16–13
 | Q3 = 14–19 | Q4 = 16–23 | points1 = Cassie Broadhead 18
 | rebounds1 = Kalani Purcell 19
 | assist1 = Kalani Purcell 4
 | otherstat1 = 
 | points2 = Anna Seilund 19
 | rebounds2 = Michaela Rakova
 | assist2 = Anna Pierce, Rachel Howard 4
 | otherstat2 = 
 | place = War Memorial GymnasiumSan Francisco, CA
 | attendance = 126
 | referee = Brian Woods, Paul Patterson, Bobby Jarmon
 | TV = TheW.tv
}}

San Diego
Broadcasters: Spencer Linton, Kristen Kozlowski, & Jason Shepherd
Series History: BYU lead series 9–3
Starting Lineups:
San Diego: Aubrey Ward-El, Caroline Buhr, Katherine Hamilton, Cori Woodward, Sydney Williams
BYU: Makenzi Pulsipher, Cassie Broadhead, Kalani Purcell, Kristine Nielson, Shalae Salmon

Pepperdine
Broadcasters: Jane Carson
Series History: BYU leads series 13–2
Starting Lineups:
BYU: Amanda Wayment, Cassie Broadhead, Kristine Nielson, Makenzi Pulsipher, Kalani Purcell
Pepperdine: Sydney Bordonaro, Megan House, Paige Fecske, Keyari Sleezer, Kayla Blair

{{basketballbox
 | bg = #e3e3e3
 | date = Jan 19
 | time = 7:00 p.m. PST
 | report = Recap
 | team1 = BYU Cougars 
 | score1 = 73'''
 | team2 = Pepperdine Waves
 | score2 = 47
 | Q1 = 14–7
 | Q2 = 27–5
 | Q3 = 19–15
 | Q4 = 13–20' | points1 = Cassie Broadhead 14
 | rebounds1 = Kalani Purcell 13
 | assist1 = Kalani Purcell 13
 | otherstat1 = 
 | points2 = Sydney Bordonaro 17
 | rebounds2 = Keyari Sleezer 7
 | assist2 = Sydney Bordonaro 3
 | otherstat2 = 
 | place = Firestone FieldhouseMalibu, CA
 | attendance = 178
 | referee = Michol Murray, Shelley Nakasone, Katrina Lyles
 | TV = TheW.tv
}}

Pacific
Broadcasters: Spencer Linton, Kristen Kozlowski, & Jason ShepherdSeries History: BYU lead series 12–2
Starting Lineups:
Pacific: Emily Simons, Eli Lopez Sagrera, GeAnna Luaulu-Summers, Unique Coleman, Desire Finnie
BYU: Amanda Wayment, Cassie Broadhead, Kristine Nielson, Makenzi Pulsipher, Kalani Purcell

Santa Clara
Broadcasters: Spencer Linton, Kristen Kozlowski, & Jason ShepherdSeries History: BYU leads series 13–2
Starting Lineups:
Santa Clara: Taylor Berry, Beth Carlson, Lori Parkinson, Naomi Jimenez, Emily Wolph
BYU: Amanda Wayment, Cassie Broadhead, Kristine Nielson, Makenzi Pulsipher, Kalani Purcell

Loyola Marymount
Broadcasters: Hunter Patterson & Javier Villagomez (TheW.tv)/ Robbie Bullough (BYUR)
Series History: BYU lead series 13–1
Starting Lineups:
BYU: Amanda Wayment, Cassie Broadhead, Kristine Nielson, Makenzi Pulsipher, Kalani Purcell
Loyola Marymount: Cheyanne Wallace, Andee Velasco, Leslie Lopez-Wood, Brittney Reed, Jackie Johnson

Gonzaga
Broadcasters: Steve Mykleburst (TheW.tv)/ (BYUR) 
Series History: Gonzaga leads series 12–8
Starting Lineups:
BYU: 
Gonzaga:

Portland
Broadcasters: Cody Barton & Lindsey Gregg (TheW.tv)/ Robbie Bullough (BYUR)
Series History: BYU lead series 18–4
Starting Lineups:
BYU: 
Portland:

Pepperdine
Broadcasters: 
Series History: BYU leads series 14–2
Starting Lineups:
Pepperdine: 
BYU:

San Francisco
Broadcasters: 
Series History: BYU leads series 15–4
Starting Lineups:
San Francisco: 
BYU:

San Diego
Broadcasters: Paula Bott (TheW.tv)/ (BYUR)
Series History: BYU lead series 10–3
Starting Lineups:
BYU: 
San Diego:

Saint Mary's
Broadcasters: Elias Feldman'' (TheW.tv)/ (BYUR) 
Series History: BYU leads series 7–6
Starting Lineups:
BYU: 
Saint Mary's:

Portland
Broadcasters: 
Series History: BYU lead series 
Starting Lineups:
Portland:
BYU:

Gonzaga
Broadcasters: 
Series History: Gonzaga leads series 
Starting Lineups:
Gonzaga: 
BYU:

See also
 2016–17 BYU Cougars men's basketball team

References

BYU Cougars women's basketball seasons
BYU
2017 Women's National Invitation Tournament participants
BYU Cougars
BYU Cougars